Kostenevo is a rural locality (a village) in Kemskoye Rural Settlement, Nikolsky District, Vologda Oblast, Russia. The population was 12 as of 2002.

Geography 
Kostenevo is located 65 km northwest of Nikolsk (the district's administrative centre) by road. Paderino is the nearest rural locality.

References 

Rural localities in Nikolsky District, Vologda Oblast